Belarus competed in the Winter Olympic Games as an independent nation for the first time at the 1994 Winter Olympics in Lillehammer, Norway. Previously, Belarusian athletes competed for the Unified Team at the 1992 Winter Olympics.

Medalists

Competitors
The following is the list of number of competitors in the Games.

Biathlon

Men

Women

Cross-country skiing

Men

Women

Figure skating

Men

Pairs

Ice Dancing

Freestyle skiing 

Men

Women

Nordic combined 

Men's individual

Events:
 normal hill ski jumping
 15 km cross-country skiing (Start delay, based on ski jumping results.)

Ski jumping

Speed skating

Men

Trivia
As of 2022, this is the only Olympic Games that Belarus competed under the tricolour white-red-white flag. At the 1996 Summer Olympics, the current national flag of green, red, and a red on white ornamental pattern was used.

References

Sources
Official Olympic Reports
International Olympic Committee results database
 Olympic Winter Games 1994, full results by sports-reference.com

Nations at the 1994 Winter Olympics
1994
Winter